The 1956–57 Tennessee A&I State Tigers basketball team represented Tennessee A&I State College (now called Tennessee State University) in National Association of Intercollegiate Athletics (NAIA) men's basketball during the 1956–57 season. Coached by third-year head coach John McLendon, the Tigers finished the season with a 31–4 record and were crowned NAIA national champions by winning the 1957 NAIA tournament. This marked the first of three consecutive national championships, a feat that no other team at any level of college basketball had previously accomplished. In addition, the 1956–57 team became the first historically black college to win a national basketball title. In 2019, all three national championship teams were inducted into the Naismith Memorial Basketball Hall of Fame.

Individual honors
 Associated Press Little All-America – Dick Barnett
 NAIA All-America – Dick Barnett, John Barnhill, James Satterwhite

References

Tennessee AandI
Tennessee State Tigers basketball seasons
NAIA men's basketball tournament championship seasons
Naismith Memorial Basketball Hall of Fame inductees
Tennessee AandI State Basketball
Tennessee AandI State Basketball